Alessandro Mazzola (c. 1546–1608) was an Italian painter, active in Parma in the late-Renaissance.

Biography
Alessandro was born in Parma to Girolamo Mazzola Bedoli, who had married the daughter of Pier Ilaro Mazzola, a cousin of Parmigianino, hence added to his name the Mazzola surname.

He painted figures in the spandrels and southern ceiling of the nave of the Cathedral. Two portraits by him were found in the National Gallery. A Virgin Mary altarpiece in a left chapel and a Christ Ascended in the second chapel of the Steccata are attributed to him.
A painting of St Francis of Assisi in the Oratory della Concezione is attributed to him. The main altarpieces for the churches of San Pietro and San Tomasso (Birth of Christ) are attributed to Alessandro.

References

1546 births
1608 deaths
16th-century Italian painters
Italian male painters
17th-century Italian painters
Painters from Parma
Italian Renaissance painters